is a professional squash player who represents Japan. She reached a career-high world ranking of World No. 50 in September 2007.

References

External links 

Japanese female squash players
Living people
1977 births
Squash players at the 2002 Asian Games
Squash players at the 2006 Asian Games
Squash players at the 2010 Asian Games
Squash players at the 2014 Asian Games
Asian Games competitors for Japan